An electrochemical aptamer-based (E-AB) biosensor has the ability to generate an electrochemical signal in response to specific target binding in vivo The signal is measured by a change in Faradaic current passed through an electrode. E-AB sensors are advantageous over previously reported aptamer-based sensors, such as fluorescence generating aptamers, due to their ability to detect target binding in vivo with real-time measurements. An E-AB sensor is composed of a three-electrode cell: an interrogating electrode, a reference electrode, and a counter electrode. A signal is generated within the electrochemical cell then measured and analyzed by a potentiostat. There are several biochemical and electrochemical parameters to optimize signal gain for E-AB biosensors. The density packing of DNA or RNA aptamers, the ACV frequency administered by the potentiostat, and the chemistry of the SAM are all factors that determine signal gain as well as the signal to noise ratio of target binding. E-AB biosensors provide a promising mechanism for in-situ sensing and feedback-controlled drug administration.

Signal generation 
The DNA or RNA aptamers are fixed on the interrogating electrode, where a redox reaction is reported by a redox tag. Gold is often used as the probe surface for interrogating electrodes. The surface of the gold electrode is packed with redox-tagged DNA or RNA aptamers. The redox reporter is often methylene blue. Upon target binding, the aptamer changes structure by folding, bringing the redox reporter closer to the gold electrode. This increase in proximity from the redox-reporter to the electrode enables faster electron transfer from the redox tag to the gold electrode. The increase in speed of electron transfer contributes to a change in Faradaic current that is detected by the potentiostat.

The reference electrode is the site of a known chemical reaction that has a known redox potential. For example, a reference electrode that harbors the reaction of silver-silver chloride (Ag/AgCl) has a fixed redox potential and is the measuring point for the redox potential of the interrogating electrode. The counter electrode (or auxiliary electrode) acts as a cathode or anode to the interrogating electrode. The applied voltage is not passed through the reference electrode due to an impedance supplied by the potentiostat. Therefore, the potential generated within the electrochemical cell is attributed to the interrogating electrode. Current is measured as potential of the interrogating electrode vs. the fixed potential of the reference electrode. The difference in potential is what produces the current in the external circuit and generates a signal. The signal quantifies target binding depending on electron transfer that is stoichimetrically proportional to target binding.

Four electrode method has also been demonstrated in an electrochemical nanoporous alumina membrane sensor, where the aptamer was grafted onto the membrane and not on the electrode. The binding of the aptamer with the target protein produces a change in impedance of the membrane which is picked up by the electrochemical sensor using an impedance spectroscopy analyzer. This approach could be beneficial in cases where the electric field of the electrode can change the aptamer structure or the biointerface which may decrease the sensing ability.

Signal optimization 
There are several parameters to consider for optimization of binding-induced electrochemical signal gain. The aptamer probe packing density, the nature of the self-assembling monolayer, and the ACV frequency are factors that affect detecting and measuring of signal.  Two main factors are considered when fabricating the packing density on the probe surface. The concentration of aptamer and the surface chemistry of the self-assembling monolayer (SAM) enable variations of desired probe packing density.

Aptamer packing density 
The density of aptamer packing on the electrode surface is an important parameter to optimize signal. Depending on the size and nature of target molecule, different aptamer packing densities favor signal gain. Studies have shown that small target molecules enable a greater signal gain for low density aptamer packing, while larger proteins as a target generate the greatest signal at intermediate probe packing densities. Signal gain decreases as packing density increase above the range of optimal signal gain due to steric hindrance. When the probe surface neighboring an aptamer is blocked by an adjacent aptamer, the redox tag on the target-bound aptamer will not have room to come into contact with the electrode, therefore failing to report target binding. The concentration of aptamer in solution that incubates a clean probe is found to be proportional to the density of aptamers that are immobilized on the probe. Studies have reported suggesting that small targets such as cocaine E-AB sensors generate the most signal with the lowest probe packing density. Conversely, larger protein targets such as the protein Thrombin generate the most signal at intermediate probe packing densities.

SAM nature and surface chemistry 
Consecutively, the probe is incubated in a SAM to make the surface of the probe that is unoccupied unreactive to target or further aptamer binding. The optimized SAM thickness is thick enough for the surface to be passivated against target binding and thin enough to transfer electrons from the redox reporter to the electrode. SAM thickness can be measured as length. It has been reported that cocaine E-AB sensors generate more signal when the SAM is thinner and therefore more conductive. However, reducing the SAM from 6 carbons to 2 carbons decreases signal, and peak current is generated using a 6-carbon SAM.

ACV frequency 
The ACV frequency is used to monitor the Faradaic current, which quantifies target binding. The generation of signal has been reported to be insensitive to ACV frequency as long as the ACV is in a sensible range, therefore, not too low to be detected or too fast. The ACV frequency is used instead of a single-directional current to protect the degradation of the electrodes. Square wave voltammetry is applied and measured to analyze the change in current as the voltage is swept linearly across an electrode.

Aptamer generation 

Design and fabrication of E-AB aptamers is consistent with methods used for previously reported aptamers. SELEX is a well known selection method for fabrication and selection of nucleotide aptamers. SELEX is relatively limited by the amount of enrichment that can be achieved in a single round. A less-reported screening method for aptamer fabrication that overcomes this limitation is affinity-based library enrichment that has been termed Particle Display.

Particle Display 
Particle Display produces higher yields of higher affinity aptamers in less rounds than conventional selection methods. In this method, libraries of aptamers are separated into aptamer particles and separated by FACS based on affinity. Only the highest affinity aptamer particles are isolated and sequenced into aptamers. This is an affinity-base selection process that is more efficient than selection methods such as SELEX. Particle display may be a reliable aptamer generation method for E-AB sensors due to the high affinity and specificity of target binding.

Promising applications 
E-AB biosensors as basis for controlled drug delivery. Feedback-controlled drug delivery for continuous drug administration with dosage levels based on integrating E-AB signal calculations into a drug administering medical device. E-AB biosensors do not require reagents, are inexpensive compared to antibody detection methods, can be used in blood or other fluids with high abundance of non-target molecules, and they are reusable. These are all factors that make E-AB biosensors a promising method for feedback-controlled drug delivery dependent on integrated calculations of computer programming.

References 

Biosensors
Electrochemistry